Notomulciber quadrisignatus is a species of beetle in the family Cerambycidae. It was described by Bernhard Schwarzer in 1925, originally under the genus Micromulciber. It is known from Taiwan.

References

Homonoeini
Beetles described in 1925